is a 1961 Japanese jidaigeki film written by Daisuke Ito and directed by Seiichi Fukuda. Hatamoto Gurentai was adapted from the novel Okubo Hikozaemon written by Genzō Murakami. Masakazu Tamura made his acting debut in the film.

Cast
Sourc:
Takahiro Tamura as Imamura Samon
 Masahiko Tsugawa as Nagasaka
 Miyuki Kuwano
 Hiroshi Nawa
 Masakazu Tamura as Mori Takehichi
 Toru Yuri
 Junzaburo Ban

References

External links
 Hatamoto Gurentai at Shochiku

1960 films
1960s Japanese-language films
Shochiku films
Jidaigeki films
Samurai films
1960s Japanese films